SS Atlantic may refer to,

SS Atlantic (1849), the Collins Line trans-Atlantic steamship.
SS Atlantic (1871), a steamship that struck rocks and  sank off Halifax, Nova Scotia in 1873, killing at least 535 people.
SS Atlantic (1953), American passenger liner, that the Chinese magnate C.Y. Tung purchased in 1971 and converted into a university at sea under the name SS Universe.

See also
SS Atlantic Conveyor, requisitioned in the Falklands War and hit by Argentine missiles in 1982.
SS Atlantic Causeway, requisitioned in the Falklands War.
SS Atlantic Empress, a Greek oil tanker that in 1979 collided with another oil tanker in the Caribbean.
SS Malolo, later renamed SS Atlantic.
SS Atlantus

Ship names